Rhyzodiastes preorbitalis is a species of ground beetle in the subfamily Rhysodinae. It was described by R.T. & J.R. Bell in 1985. It is found in Thailand (Doi Suthep).

References

Rhyzodiastes
Beetles of Asia
Insects of Thailand
Beetles described in 1985